The National Sports Club of India (NSCI) is a twin-city based sports club with branches in Mumbai and Delhi, India.

Sardar Vallabhbhai Patel Indoor Stadium is an indoor sports arena that seats 5,000 people. The stadium was established in 1957 and the foundation stone was laid by former Chief Minister of Maharashtra Yashwantrao Chavan and the facility is administered by National Sports Club of India. It includes the facilities like  Tennis, Badminton, Billiards, Table Tennis, Carrom and Wrestling.

References

External links 

 National Sports Club of India, Mumbai
 National Sports Club of India, Delhi

Sports clubs in Mumbai
Sports clubs in Delhi
Badminton venues
Sports organizations established in 1957
1957 establishments in Delhi
Gentlemen's clubs in India